The Borzeşti church is located in Onești, Bacău County, Romania and it was ordered by Ştefan cel Mare to be built in 1493, with construction lasting from July 9, 1493, to October 12, 1494. Legend has it that the church was dedicated to a child killed during the invasions of the Tatars.

The church is designed in a Moldavian style, just as the Războieni Church and the Piatra Neamţ Church (1497–1498). The murals of the church were restored in 2004. The Gothic windows are partially destroyed.

Churches established by Stephen the Great
Medieval architecture
Religious buildings and structures completed in 1494
Romanian Orthodox churches in Romania
Historic monuments in Bacău County